Fahlian or Fehlian or Fahleyan , also rendered as Faleyun, may refer to:
 Fahlian-e Olya
 Fahlian-e Sofla
 Fahlian Rural District